2018 World Masters Athletics Championships is the 23rd in a series of World Masters Athletics Outdoor Championships
that took place along the Costa del Sol in Málaga and Torremolinos, Spain from 4 to 16 September 2018.

This was the second even year of this biennial series as beginning in 2016 at Perth, Australia, the Championships moved to be held in even-numbered years to avoid conflict with the quadrennial World Masters Games, which had been held in odd-numbered years since 2005.

The main venue was Estadio Ciudad de Málaga (MAL).

Supplemental venues included Ciudad Deportiva de Carranque (CAR), Complejo Deportivo Universitario (UNI), and Pista Atletismo Torremolinos in the Estadio Polideportivo Ciudad de Torremolinos complex (TOR).

The three-letter codes for the venues are used in the results.

This Championships was organized by World Masters Athletics (WMA) in coordination with a Local Organising Committee (LOC) led by Francisco de la Torre, Mayor of Málaga.

The WMA is the global governing body of the sport of athletics for athletes 35 years of age or older, setting rules for masters athletics competition.

At the 2016 General Assembly, a motion was passed to change two events after the 2016 Championships:

The Marathon would be replaced by the Half Marathon.
The 10K Road Race would be replaced by the 10K Race Walk.
Thus, in addition to a full range of track and field events,

non-stadia events in this Championships included 8K Cross Country, 10K Road Race, 10K Race Walk, 20K Race Walk and Half Marathon.

Controversy
The Spanish government requested, through Real Federación Española de Atletismo, that the country of Gibraltar not be permitted to participate in the Championships.

Athletes from Gibraltar could compete as "neutral" athletes and cannot wear their national uniform.

In protest, four out of the five athletes from Gibraltar decided to withdraw and boycott the Championships.

Results
Official daily results are listed at Malaga2018,

and archived at RFEA.

Past Championships results are archived at WMA;

the 2018 results are summarized in a Medals Table

and a Records Table.

Additional archives are available from British Masters Athletic Federation

as a searchable pdf,

and from Victorian Masters Athletics as a searchable pdf.

Masters world records set at this Championships are listed below and are based on the WMA Records Table unless otherwise noted.

More complete lists of medalists are contained in separate articles for women and for men.

Women

World records are listed below.

Men

World records are listed below.

References

External links

World Masters Athletics Championships
World Masters Athletics Championships
International athletics competitions hosted by Spain
World Masters Athletics Championships
Masters athletics (track and field) records